EyeSee is an American behavioral research (market research) company operating globally. 

EyeSee operates in the USA (NYC), Belgium (Ghent), France (Paris), United Kingdom (London) and Serbia (Belgrade).

Technology

Eye tracking technology enables following the gaze, while people look at stimuli on the screen, to know what areas are seen, in what order and for how long. The outcomes of eye tracking are heat maps (visual representation of aggregated attention), areas of interest and gaze plots (viewing order).

Facial coding technology detects facial expressions and can register 7 basic emotions: happiness, surprise, confusion, disgust, fear, sadness and neutrality. Facial muscle movements are spontaneous, which makes facial coding an objective method for understanding emotional reactions.

An alternative (or complementary) technology that is a UX (user experience) platform that can register navigation patterns and clicks.

History

EyeSee was founded in 2012 by Olivier Tilleuil who is currently the company’s CEO, and plays an active role in the company.

Recognition 
The same year EyeSee won Bizidee – the biggest entrepreneurship competition in Belgium. The company was one of the Top 10 Flemish technology businesses of the future according to De Standaard. In 2014, Olivier Tilleuil won the ‘BRAVE’ Award at 2014 BAQMaR Conference, organized by the Belgian Association for Quali and Quanti Research. In May 2015, the company won Global Mobile Innovator Competition in NYC .

References

Market research organizations
 Marketing
 
Companies based in East Flanders